Kolsh is a village and a former municipality in Kukës County, Albania. At the 2015 local government reform it became a subdivision of the municipality Kukës. The population at the 2011 census was 1,250. The municipal unit consists of the following villages:

 Kolsh     (193 families and a population of 856)
 Mamëz     (170 families and a population of 790)
 Myç-Mamëz (118 families and a population of 694)

Info

The municipal unit borders Fierza Lake to the East and to the North, Malzi to the west and Surroj to the south. This municipal unit has 481 families and a total population of 2,340 inhabitants.
Common family names in the Kolsh area include: Kurpalaj, Lleshi, Gjocera, Toda, Visha, Çika, Doci, Paci. This zone is rich with water sources, mountains, fields, and resources of mineral materials, like chrome, iron or nickel.
Agriculture is one of the most important occupations. The other benefits come from emigrants in EU.

References

Former municipalities in Kukës County
Administrative units of Kukës
Villages in Kukës County